The year 1682 in music involved some significant events.

Classical music
Heinrich Ignaz Franz von Biber – Plaudite tympana
Jacques Bittner – Pièces de luth
John Blow – Ode for New Year's Day
Marc-Antoine Charpentier 
Quam dilecta, H.186
In nativitatem Domini canticum, H.393
Les plaisirs de Versailles, H.480
Andrea Grossi – Sonate a 2–5 instromenti
Johann Sigismund Kusser – Composition de musique suivant la méthode françoise
Carlo Mannelli – Sonate a tre, Op.2
Alessandro Melani – Concerti Spirituali, Op.3
Georg Muffat – , a collection of sonatas
Johann Rosenmüller – Sonatae à 2,3,4 e 5 stromenti da arco et altri
Robert de Visée – 
Neu Leipziger Gesangbuch

Opera
Domenico Gabrielli – Flavio Cuniberto
Jean-Baptiste Lully – Persée

Births
January 17 – Jean-François Dandrieu, composer (died 1738)
 (baptised) February 21 – Johann Jacob Bach III, German composer, older brother of Johann Sebastian Bach, (died 1722)
April 3 – Johann Valentin Rathgeber, German composer (died 1750)
April 16 – Jean-Joseph Mouret, French composer (died 1738)
September 13 –  Theodor Christlieb Reinhold, composer (died 1755)
Christian Ferdinand Abel, German violist (died 1761)
Santiago de Murcia, composer for guitar (died 1737)
Vijaya Dasa, composer, philosopher, and saint (died 1755)

Deaths
February 25 – Alessandro Stradella, Italian composer (born 1639; murdered)
Francis Sempill, Scottish writer of ballads (born c.1616)

References

 
17th century in music
Music by year